Irish Folk Furniture is a short film directed by Tony Donoghue which won the prize for Best Animation at the Sundance Film Festival. It uses stop-motion animation to breathe life into the disregarded pieces of furniture that frequently lie rotting in Irish barns and sheds, showing the process of renovating them and returning them to the homes they once inhabited. The short was produced by Cathal Black under the IFB ‘Frameworks’ animated short film scheme.

References

Sundance Film Festival award winners
Stop-motion animated short films
Irish animated short films
2012 films
2012 short films
Animated documentary films
English-language Irish films